The 2020–21 SIU Edwardsville Cougars men's basketball team represented Southern Illinois University Edwardsville during the 2020–21 NCAA Division I men's basketball season. The Cougars, led by second-year head coach Brian Barone, played their home games in the First Community Arena at Vadalabene Center in Edwardsville, Illinois as members of the Ohio Valley Conference.

Previous season 
The Cougars finished the 2019–20 season 8–23, 5–13 in OVC play to finish in a tie for tenth place. The Cougars failed to qualify for the OVC Tournament.

Preseason 
Five players who saw major playing time and a third-year former walk-on return from the 8–23 team of 2019–20.  They are joined by one junior who saw considerable action in the 2018-19 season but sat out last season as a medical "redshirt", three freshmen, three junior college transfers, and one transfer from another Division I program. Coach Barone, his assistants, and the Cougars recruited probably the strongest incoming group in the program's history. The recruits included SIUE's first legitimate "blue chip" recruit, Ray'Sean Taylor from nearby Collinsville, who suffered an ACL injury that ended his first Cougars season before it began. A second :"blue chipper" came on board with Sidney Wilson's late transfer from Cinnecticut. Three scholarship players with eligibility remaining did not return; two transferred to other Division I programs, and Zeke Moore is playing professionally in Spain.
 
In a vote of conference coaches and sports information directors, SIUE was picked to finish in 11th place in the OVC.

Regular season
After leading the team with career-highs of 18 points, 7 rebounds, and 5 assists in the Cougars' win at Morehead State, Sidney Wilson was named the OVC Newcomer of the Week on December 21.

The ongoing COVID-19 pandemic necessitated revision after revision to the Cougars' schedule. The game at Northwestern was cancelled, and nine (9) OVC games were postponed, including a postponement of a rescheduled game.

After averaging 18.0 points, 4.3 rebounds, 2.3 assists and 1.3 blocks/game while hitting 50 percent (20-of-40) from the field and 73.3 percent (11-of-15) from the free throw line in three road games, Sydney Wilson was again named the  OVC Newcomer of the Week on February 1.

The Cougars went 33 days without a game in the span between December 18 and January 21, To make up for the nine game postponements, SIUE was scheduled to play four games per week. Then the OVC ruled that no more than three games were to be played per week; this change brought about a tenth postponement and the cancelation of a game versus Jacksonville State.

COVID-19, injuries, and the wear and tear of too many games in too few days to make up for all of the postponements resulted in less success than hoped for. However, the Cougars qualified for th Ohio Valley Conference Tournament, after missing it last season. This was helped by the Cougars' six road wins, the most in the Division I era.

Postseason
The Cougars, the 8th seed in the OVC Tournament, Lost to the top-seeded Belmont Bruins for a third time, but by a much closer margin.

Roster
Source =  

 

 † = Joined the team at the semester break.
 # = Mid-season injury.

Schedule and results

|-
!colspan=9 style=| Non-conference regular season

|-
!colspan=9 style=| Ohio Valley Conference regular season

|-
!colspan=9 style=| Ohio Valley Conference Tournament

|-

† = Due to the many schedule changes, it was necessary to move SIUE's home game with Jacksonville State to Jacksonville, AL, but the game was later cancelled, when the OVC limited teams to three games per week.

References

SIU Edwardsville
SIU Edwardsville Cougars men's basketball seasons
Edward
Edward